Daniil Medvedev defeated Reilly Opelka in the final, 6–4, 6–3 to win the men's singles tennis title at the 2021 Canadian Open. It was his fourth ATP Masters 1000 title and 12th career title. Opelka was contesting his maiden Masters 1000 final.

Rafael Nadal was the two-time reigning champion from when the event was last held in 2019 and was vying to tie Ivan Lendl's record of six Canadian Open titles, but did not participate due to a foot injury.

Seeds
All seeds received a bye into the second round.

Draw

Finals

Top half

Section 1

Section 2

Bottom half

Section 3

Section 4

Qualifying

Seeds

Qualifiers

Lucky losers

Qualifying draw

First qualifier

Second qualifier

Third qualifier

Fourth qualifier

Fifth qualifier

Sixth qualifier

References

External links
Main draw
Qualifying draw

Men's Singles